The Rogues is an American television series that appeared on NBC from September 13, 1964, to April 18, 1965, starring David Niven, Charles Boyer, and Gig Young as a related trio of former conmen who could, for the right price, be persuaded to trick a very wealthy and heinously unscrupulous mark. Although it won the 1964 Golden Globe award for Best Television Series, the show was cancelled after one season consisting of thirty episodes.

Production
Niven and Boyer were two of the co-owners of Four Star Television, which produced the show.

Although sometimes appearing together, the three lead actors tended to rotate appearances as their schedules permitted. This resulted in Young helming more episodes because the other two were engaged on other projects; Boyer and Niven were still major film stars (Niven had received an Academy Award for Best Actor in 1958).

Larry Hagman, who portrayed "J.R. Ewing" in the television series Dallas two decades later, was brought aboard for the last two episodes to help fill in for Young, who had been the lead in most of the episodes. The only episode in which Niven and Boyer had more or less equal roles was "Bless You, G. Carter Huntington," which also featured Young in a substantial capacity. Niven briefly appears in a number of episodes (often toward the beginning of the show), but took the lead in only three out of the series' thirty episodes because of his film schedule. Many of his scenes were shot separately in other locations, especially later in the series.

Additional continuity was provided by the presences of Gladys Cooper as Auntie Margaret St. Clair and Robert Coote as Timmy St. Clair, appearing in their supporting roles in most episodes.

Guest stars included Eddie Albert, Tol Avery, Broderick Crawford, John Dehner, Sally Kellerman, Ida Lupino (also a member of Four Star Television though not an owner), Elsa Martinelli, Walter Matthau, Darren McGavin, Dina Merrill, Susan Oliver, George Sanders, Telly Savalas, Gia Scala, Everett Sloane, Raquel Welch and Marie Windsor.

Four Star President David Charnay announced a feature film revival to star David Niven and Charles Boyer, scheduled for 1968, but nothing came of it. In 1989, Blake Edwards optioned the series for a revival, but ABC passed on the unproduced pilot script in 1990.

Repeats of the series were aired on Me-TV during 2011-2012 and again in September 2014, and on Decades in March 2015.  Commencing in 2018, the show was broadcast in the United Kingdom on Talking Pictures TV.

Cast
 David Niven as Alexander "Alec" Fleming
 Charles Boyer as Marcel St. Clair
 Gig Young as Tony Fleming
 Gladys Cooper as Auntie Margaret St. Clair
 Robert Coote as Timmy St. Clair
 Larry Hagman as Mark Fleming (came on halfway through season)
 John Williams as Inspector Briscoe
 Barbara Bouchet as Elsa Idonescu

Episodes

Awards and nominations

External links 

 

1964 American television series debuts
1965 American television series endings
Black-and-white American television shows
NBC original programming
Television series by Four Star Television
Television series by 20th Century Fox Television
1960s American crime television series
1960s American comedy television series